Ifunanya Debbie "Ify" Ibekwe (born 5 October 1989) is a Nigerian American professional basketball player for the Virtus Eirene Ragusa and the Nigeria women's national team.

Arizona statistics

WNBA
Ibekwe was selected in the second round of the 2011 WNBA draft (24th overall) by the Seattle Storm.

National Team Career
Ify represents the Nigerian Women's National Team.

Personal
Ibekwe is the daughter of Nigerian parents, Agatha and Augustine Ibekwe. She has two brothers who played college basketball, Onye Ibekwe played for Long Beach State and Ekene Ibekwe played for the University of Maryland. She also has one sister, Chinyere.

References

External links
 Arizona Wildcats player profile

1989 births
Living people
American expatriate basketball people in New Zealand
American sportspeople of Nigerian descent
American women's basketball players
Arizona Wildcats women's basketball players
Basketball players at the 2020 Summer Olympics
Basketball players from California
Los Angeles Sparks players
Nigerian women's basketball players
Olympic basketball players of Nigeria
People from Carson, California
Power forwards (basketball)
Seattle Storm draft picks
Seattle Storm players
Small forwards
South East Queensland Stars players
Sportspeople from Los Angeles County, California
Citizens of Nigeria through descent
African-American basketball players
Nigerian people of African-American descent
American emigrants to Nigeria
21st-century African-American sportspeople